The golden-backed bishop (Euplectes aureus) is a species of bird in the family Ploceidae.
It is found in western Angola and São Tomé Island.

References

golden-backed bishop
Birds of the Gulf of Guinea
Birds of Central Africa
golden-backed bishop
golden-backed bishop
Taxonomy articles created by Polbot